Celia Gould (born November 20, 1957) is an American businesswoman and politician who has served as the director of the Idaho Department of Agriculture since 2007.

Early life and education 
Gould was born in Twin Falls, Idaho. She earned a Bachelor of Arts degree in political science and a Master of Public Administration from Boise State University.

Career 
Gould is the owner/operator of a beef cattle ranching operation, G+ Ranches of Buhl, Idaho. Gould and her husband also have a beef operation in the Declo area.

She previously served in the Idaho House of Representatives from district 22A from 1986 to 2002.

She served on the Agricultural Affairs, Education, and Revenue and Taxation committees, in addition to serving as the Chairman of the Judiciary, Rules and Administration Committee.

Personal life 
Her husband is former Speaker of the House Bruce Newcomb. She has five children and ten grandchildren.

References

1957 births
Living people
Republican Party members of the Idaho House of Representatives
State cabinet secretaries of Idaho